Madalena is a small town on São Tomé Island in São Tomé and Príncipe. Its population is 221 (2012 census). It lies 1 km northeast of Santa Margarida, 2.5 km south of Boa Entrada and 7 km west of the capital São Tomé.

Population history

Notable person
Filipe Santo, singer, winner of the 2nd STP Music Awards in 2016.

References

Populated places in Mé-Zóchi District